Karhu is a Finnish surname meaning "bear". Notable people with the surname include:

 Minna Karhu (born 1971), Finnish freestyle skier
 Kimmo Karhu, Finnish racing cyclist
 Tero Karhu (born 1979), Finnish footballer
 Niko Karhu (born 1993), Finnish ice hockey defenceman

Finnish-language surnames
Surnames from nicknames